Aerie is the fifth studio album by American singer-songwriter John Denver.  It debuted on the Billboard 200 album charts on December 4, 1971, hitting No. 75.

The song "The Eagle and the Hawk" was the title theme music to an ABC documentary of the same title starring both Denver and noted conservationist Morlan Nelson. This documentary is in storage at ABC, but it has not been repeated nor released by ABC.  Denver's piloting skills in sail planes was shown.

Track listing

Personnel

Musicians
John Denver – 6- and 12-string guitar, vocals, arrangements
Kenneth Boaz – vocals
Gary Chester – drums, percussion
Eric Weissberg – banjo, fiddle, pedal steel guitar
Paul Griffin – piano, organ
Richard Kniss – bass, arrangements
George Marge – woodwind
Paul Prestopino – banjo, dobro, guitar
Al Rogers – percussion
Mike Taylor – guitar, dobro, arrangements
Toots Thielemans – harmonica

Paula Ballan – vocals
Diane Kniss – vocals
Turnpike Tom – vocals
Alec White – vocals
Mary Angela White – vocals
Barbara Carlson – vocals
Andromeda Quasar – vocals
Bill Danoff – vocals
Keith Lane – vocals
Candy Ledbetter – vocals
Ron Ledbetter – vocals
Elizabeth Lindsay – vocals
Steve Mandell – vocals
Anne Denver – vocals
Taffy Nivert – vocals

Production
Pat Benson – album photography
Tom Brown – recording technician
Jim Crotty – recording engineer
Ray Hall – mixer, recording engineer
Pat Martin – recording technician 
Gus Mossler – recording technician
Milton Okun – producer
Joe Stelmach – album cover design

Charts

References

John Denver albums
1971 albums
RCA Records albums
Albums produced by Milt Okun